The Turkmenistan Futsal Super Cup is a Turkmenistan  futsal competition contested by the winners of the Turkmenistan Futsal League and the winners of the Turkmenistan Futsal Cup.

Winners

Performance by club

References

External links
futsalplanet.com
Sport at Turkmenportal
Football Federation of Turkmenistan

Photos 
 Supercup 2019
 Supercup 2020

Turkmenistan
2010s establishments in Turkmenistan